Luigi Falco (21 March 1951 – 3 February 2013) was an Italian politician and doctor.

He was member of the Christian Democratic Centre Party. He has served as Mayor of Caserta from 1997 to 2005. He was elected mayor of Caserta to the administrative of 1997. He was again candidate for mayor for Popolari UDEUR. He was re-elected for a second term in the 2002 elections. He fell out of office as mayor in December 2005.

Biography
Luigi Falco was born in Dragoni, Italy on 1951 and died in Piedimonte Matese, Italy on 2013 at the age of 61. He was director of the neonatology unit of the Sant'Anna and San Sebastiano hospital in Caserta.

See also
 List of mayors of Caserta

References

External links
 Luigi Falco on Openpolis
 Luigi Falco on amministratori.interno.gov.it.

1951 births
2013 deaths
Christian Democratic Centre politicians
21st-century Italian politicians
20th-century Italian politicians
Mayors of Caserta